Abdu Mohammed Hussein al-Hudhaifi was the minister of Yemen's Interior Ministry from 26 May 2015 to 1 December 2015.

References

Living people
Yemeni Sunni Muslims
Interior ministers of Yemen
People from Dhale Governorate
1954 births